Aletodon is a genus of ground dwelling insectivores, now extinct.  The genus flourished from around 58.7 to 55.8 Ma.  It was native to Colorado, Wyoming, and western North Dakota.

Species
There are currently 4 recognized species in this genus:
 Aletodon conardae (Winterfeld, 1982)
 Aletodon gunnelli (Gingerich, 1977)
 Aletodon mellon (Van Valen, 1978)
 Aletodon quadravus (Gingerich, 1983)

References

Fossil taxa described in 1977
Paleocene mammals
Prehistoric mammals of North America
Prehistoric placental genera
Condylarths